Afrochic Diaspora Festival is an annual multi-disciplinary arts festival created in 2010 by Amoye Henry, Natassia Parson-Morris, Natasha Morris and Nijha Frederick-Allen to highlight the culture and artistic expression of the African-Canadian community within and around Toronto. The annual music festival highlights young and emerging talent from Canadians of African descent through visual arts, fashion, and music.

Notable headliners 

 Erykah Badu
 11:11
 Shi Wisdom
 Spek Won
 Leila Dey
 Jidenna
 Wale
 Teedra Moses
 Stacey Mckenzie
 Issa Rae

Known hosts 

 Amanda Parris
 Alicia ‘Ace’ West
 Nigel D. Birch
 Femi Lawson
 Kim Katrin Milan

Partners 

 Aurora Cannabis Inc
 Year of Return, Ghana 2019

References

External links 

 

African and Black nationalism in the United States
African culture
African diaspora history
African-American culture
African-American diaspora
American expatriates in Ghana
Festivals in Ghana
Ghanaian diaspora
Immigration to Ghana
Pan-Africanism in Ghana
Post–civil rights era in African-American history
Repatriated Africans
Tourism in Ghana
Transatlantic relations